Nguyễn Thị Ngọc Diễm (1721–1784), posthumous name Từ Trạch (慈澤), was a consort of lord Trịnh Doanh.

Biography
Lady Nguyễn Thị Ngọc Diễm was born in 1721 at Linh Đường village, Linh Đàm commune, Thanh Trì district, Southern of Phụng Thiên prefect. She was commended to Trịnh clan's palace by her father who was Duke Nguyễn Văn Luân (阮文倫, 1686–1739). She became a concubine of prince Trịnh Doanh and was granted the title Hoa Dung (花容).

References

 Bà Nguyễn Thị Ngọc Diễm Phụ nữ Today.
 Nguyễn Thị Ngọc Diễm Báo Thanh Hóa.
 Danh sĩ Thanh Hóa và việc học thời xưa, Trần Văn Thịnh - Trịnh Mạnh - Lê Bá Chức - Nguyễn Thế Long, Nhà xuất bản Thanh Hóa - 1995.
 Ân vương Trịnh Doanh, Trịnh Xuân Tiến – Nhà xuất bản Lao động - 2003.

1721 births
1784 deaths
Princess consorts of Trịnh lords
People from Hanoi
Vietnamese women poets
18th-century women writers
18th-century Vietnamese women